Vilaplana is a municipality in the comarca of Baix Camp, in the province of Tarragona, Catalonia, Spain.

The Serra de la Mussara, a subrange of the Prades Mountains rises north of the town. This mountain range is named after the abandoned village of La Mussara, located in the Vilaplana municipal term.

The church is dedicated to Mare de Déu de la Llet, the breastfeeding Virgin Mary.

See also
Prades Mountains

References

Tomàs Bonell, Jordi; Descobrir Catalunya, poble a poble, Prensa Catalana, Barcelona, 1994

External links

Vilaplana Town Hall webpage
 Government data pages 

Municipalities in Baix Camp
Populated places in Baix Camp